Cláudio Mendes Prates (born 18 September 1965), known as Cláudio Prates or just Claudinho, is a Brazilian retired footballer who played as a forward, and is the current assistant manager of Bahia.

Playing career
Known as Claudinho during his playing days, he was an Internacional de Santa Maria youth graduate. In 1986 he joined Vasco da Gama, and went on to feature sparingly for the club during his three-year spell, split by loans to América-SP, Bragantino, Juventus-SP and Primeira Liga side S.C. Farense.

Claudinho subsequently represented Vitória, Caxias, Figueirense, Košice and ABC before moving to Arabic football. He retired in 2004, with Al Khaleej.

Managerial career
Shortly after retiring, Prates began his career with former club Vitória, being an assistant of the youth setup. In 2006 he was promoted to the first team, remaining as an assistant until the arrival of Givanildo Oliveira as manager.

Prates subsequently followed Givanildo at Brasiliense, Paysandu, Vila Nova, Mogi Mirim, América Mineiro, Sport, Santa Cruz, Ponte Preta and Remo before parting ways in 2011 to become Joinville's assistant. Late in that year he returned to América, being an assistant but also interim manager on some occasions.

On 19 October 2016 Prates left Coelho, and was named Palmeiras' assistant the following 10 January. In April 2018, he joined Bahia; initially an assistant, he was appointed interim manager after the dismissal of Guto Ferreira.

Honours

Player
Vasco da Gama
 Taça Guanabara: 1986

Bragantino
 Campeonato Paulista Série A2: 1988

Vitória
 Campeonato Baiano: 1990, 1992
 Campeonato Brasileiro Série B runner up: 1992

ABC
 Campeonato Potiguar: 1997

Al Arabi
 Kuwait Emir Cup: 1999, 2000
 Kuwait Crown Prince Cup: 1999, 2000
 Al Kurafi Cup: 1999

References

External links
  
 

1965 births
Living people
Sportspeople from Rio Grande do Sul
Brazilian footballers
Association football forwards
Campeonato Brasileiro Série A players
Saudi Professional League players
Qatar Stars League players
UAE Pro League players
UAE First Division League players
CR Vasco da Gama players
América Futebol Clube (SP) players
Clube Atlético Bragantino players
Clube Atlético Juventus players
Esporte Clube Vitória players
Sociedade Esportiva e Recreativa Caxias do Sul players
Figueirense FC players
ABC Futebol Clube players
Primeira Liga players
S.C. Farense players
FC VSS Košice players
Al-Arabi SC (Qatar) players
Al-Shamal SC players
Al-Arabi SC (Kuwait) players
Al-Shoulla FC players
Khor Fakkan Sports Club players
Brazilian expatriate footballers
Brazilian expatriate sportspeople in Portugal
Brazilian expatriate sportspeople in Slovakia
Brazilian expatriate sportspeople in Qatar
Brazilian expatriate sportspeople in Kuwait
Brazilian expatriate sportspeople in Saudi Arabia
Brazilian expatriate sportspeople in the United Arab Emirates
Expatriate footballers in Portugal
Expatriate footballers in Slovakia
Expatriate footballers in Qatar
Expatriate footballers in Kuwait
Expatriate footballers in Saudi Arabia
Expatriate footballers in the United Arab Emirates
Kuwait Premier League players